George Daniel Ewing, Jr. (born March 26, 1983) is an American professional basketball player.

College career
A  guard from Duke University, Ewing played for four seasons at the college under coach Mike Krzyzewski from 2001 to 2005. Prior to Duke, he played for Willowridge High School in Missouri City, Texas along with T. J. Ford and Ivan McFarlin. He was selected as a McDonald's All-American in 2001.

Professional career

NBA
Ewing was selected by the NBA's Los Angeles Clippers in the second round (32nd overall) of the 2005 NBA Draft. He played with the club during two seasons, as a backup. In 127 regular season contests, he averaged 3 points, one rebound and one assist per game. On June 29, 2007, he was waived by the Clippers.

Europe
On July 23, 2007, Ewing signed a two-year contract with the Russian League club BC Khimki. After one year in Russia with Khimki, Ewing joined Polish League's Asseco Prokom Sopot for the 2008–09 season and remained with the team until 2011.

In July 2011, he signed a one-year contract with Azovmash Mariupol of Ukraine. In December 2012, he signed with Beşiktaş of the Turkish Basketball League for the rest of the season.

In July 2013, he signed with a one-year deal Paris-Levallois Basket of the French LNB Pro A. On October 1, 2014, Ewing signed a six-week contract with Le Mans Sarthe. On October 29, 2014,  his contract with the team was extended for the rest of the season.

On August 15, 2015, Ewing signed a one-year deal with the Lithuanian club Neptūnas Klaipėda.

On August 18, 2016, Ewing signed with Israeli club Maccabi Ashdod. On February 22, 2017, he returned to Neptūnas.

References

External links
 
 EuroLeague profile
 nba.com draft profile
 eurobasket.com profile

1983 births
Living people
African-American basketball players
American expatriate basketball people in Argentina
American expatriate basketball people in France
American expatriate basketball people in Israel
American expatriate basketball people in Lithuania
American expatriate basketball people in Poland
American expatriate basketball people in Russia
American expatriate basketball people in Turkey
American expatriate basketball people in Ukraine
American men's basketball players
Asseco Gdynia players
Basketball players from Florida
BC Azovmash players
BC Khimki players
BC Neptūnas players
Beşiktaş men's basketball players
CSU Sibiu players
Duke Blue Devils men's basketball players
Ferro Carril Oeste basketball players
Le Mans Sarthe Basket players
Los Angeles Clippers draft picks
Los Angeles Clippers players
Maccabi Ashdod B.C. players
McDonald's High School All-Americans
Metropolitans 92 players
People from Milton, Florida
Point guards
Shooting guards
21st-century African-American sportspeople
20th-century African-American people